
Year 306 BC was a year of the pre-Julian Roman calendar. At the time, it was known as the Year of the Consulship of Tremulus and Arvina (or, less frequently, year 448 Ab urbe condita). The denomination 306 BC for this year has been used since the early medieval period, when the Anno Domini calendar era became the prevalent method in Europe for naming years.

Events 
 By place 
 Cyprus 
 Demetrius Poliorcetes lands on Cyprus and besieges Menelaus, brother of Egypt's ruler, Ptolemy I Soter, at Salamis. Ptolemy Soter, coming to his brother's aid, is decisively defeated in the Battle of Salamis. The battle completely destroys the naval power of Egypt and results in the capture of Cyprus by Demetrius. This gives Demetrius' father, Antigonus I Monophthalmus, control of the Aegean and the eastern Mediterranean.

 Syria 
 Antigonus I Monophthalmus proclaims himself king of Asia Minor and northern Syria thus commencing the Antigonid dynasty. He appoints his son Demetrius king and co-regent.

 Sicily 
 A peace agreement is reached between Syracuse and Carthage. The peace restricts Carthaginian power in Sicily to the area west of the Halycus (Platani) River. This agreement allows the tyrant of Syracuse, Agathocles, to strengthen his rule over the Greek cities of Sicily.

 Egypt 
 Antigonus Monophthalmus tries to follow up his victory in Cyprus by invading Egypt with a large army and a formidable fleet, but Ptolemy Soter successfully holds the frontier against him. However, the year's events mean that Ptolemy no longer engages in overseas expeditions against Antigonus.

 Thrace 
 A four-drachma coin, picturing Alexander the Great, is issued by Lysimachos from this time until 281 BC. At least one of them is now preserved at the British Museum in London.

Births

Deaths

References